Jacques Brault (29 March 1933 – 20 October 2022) was a French Canadian poet and translator who lived in Cowansville, Quebec, Canada. He was born to a poor family, but received an excellent education at the Université de Montréal and at the Sorbonne in Paris. He became a professor at the Université de Montréal, in the Département d'études françaises and the Institut des sciences médiévales, and made frequent appearances as a cultural commentator on Radio-Canada.

Jacques Brault's extensive body of writings includes works of outstanding merit in most literary genres. He is the author of plays, novels and works of short fiction, translations and several seminal works of Canadian literary criticism. However, it is primarily for his work as a poet that Jacques Brault is admired by readers and known outside of Canada.

Brault died on 20 October 2022, at the age of 89.

Works
Mémoire – 1965
Allain Grandbois: poètes d'aujourd'hui — 1968
La poésie ce matin — 1971
Trois partitions — 1972
L'en dessous l'admirable — 1975 (translated into English as Within the Mystery)
Poèmes des quatre côtes — 1975
Agonie — 1984
Moments fragiles — 1984 (translated into English as Fragile Moments)
Poèmes — 1986
La poussière du chemin — 1989
Il n'y a plus de chemin — 1990 (translated into English as On the Road No More)
Lac noire
Ô saisons, ô châteaux — 1991
Au petit matin — 1993
Chemin faisan — 1995
Au fonds du jardin — accompagnements — 1996
Au bras des ombres — 1997

Accolades
Québec-Paris award, for Mé, in 1968
Governor General's Award
for Quand nous serons heureux, in 1970
for Agonie, in 1985
for his translation of the collection of poems Transfiguration by E.D Blodgett, in 1999
Prix Alain-Grandbois, for Il n'y a plus de chemin, in 1991
Ludger-Duvernay Prize (1978)
Prix Athanase-David (1986)
Prix Gilles-Corbeil (1996)

See also

 List of French Canadian writers
 List of Quebec authors

References
"Jacques Brault" in Canadian Writers, an examination of archival manuscripts, typescripts, correspondence, journals and notebooks at Library and Archives Canada

Footnotes

External links
Critical bibliography on Jacques Brault's works (Auteurs.contemporain.info) 
Jacques Brault's entry in The Canadian Encyclopedia
 Fonds Jacques Bault (R11714) at Library and Archives Canada
 

1933 births
2022 deaths
French Quebecers
University of Poitiers alumni
University of Paris alumni
Academic staff of the Université de Montréal
People from Cowansville
Canadian poets in French
Governor General's Award-winning fiction writers
Governor General's Award-winning translators
Prix Alain-Grandbois
Prix Athanase-David winners
20th-century Canadian poets
20th-century Canadian male writers
Canadian male poets
20th-century Canadian translators
Writers from Quebec
Canadian expatriates in France